Deckers may refer to:

Deckers (surname)
Deckers, Colorado, United States
Deckers Creek, a river in West Virginia, United States
Deckers Outdoor Corporation, a footwear manufacturer
In the fictional Shadowrun universe, computer hackers are known as "deckers"

See also
Decker (disambiguation)
Dekkers